Davide Cordone (born 17 August 1971) is a former Italian footballer.

Biography
Cordone started his career at Pro Patria, at that time at Serie D. He played a season for Casale, then left for Livorno where he played 5 seasons. He won promotion playoffs to Serie C1 in 1997. In 1998, he joined A.C. Milan but loaned to Serie B side Monza. He was one of the player that swapped between Inter & Milan with inflated nominal transfer fees, made the club gained "false profit" in 2000s.

In 1999, he swapped with Fabio Di Sauro, making a capital gains of reported €4.7 million, but in terms of Di Sauro's registration rights. He was loaned to Serie B side Ternana then Catania. He remained for Catania for 3 seasons, which he won promotion to Serie B in 2002, along with Marco Bonura, another player bought by Inter with inflated nominal value.

In summer 2003, he joined Serie B side Genoa. He then played  seasons for Serie C2 side Ivrea, and last played for Serie B struggler Catanzaro which he joined in January 2006.

References

External links
 

Italian footballers
Serie B players
U.S. Livorno 1915 players
A.C. Monza players
Ternana Calcio players
Catania S.S.D. players
Genoa C.F.C. players
U.S. Catanzaro 1929 players
Association football midfielders
Sportspeople from Varese
1971 births
Living people
A.S.D. Calcio Ivrea players
Footballers from Lombardy